SuperBrawl III was the third SuperBrawl professional wrestling pay-per-view (PPV) event produced by World Championship Wrestling (WCW). It took place on February 21, 1993 from the Asheville Civic Center in Asheville, North Carolina in the United States.

The main event was a White Castle of Fear Strap match between Big Van Vader and Sting. Vader's WCW World Heavyweight Championship was not on the line in the main event as the match was not sanctioned by WCW. This event marked the return of Ric Flair to WCW and Davey Boy Smith's WCW debut. The event also featured The Great Muta versus Barry Windham for the NWA World Heavyweight Championship.

This was the first WCW pay-per-view with Eric Bischoff as executive producer, though he continued to operate as an announcer on television and his new role was only mentioned in the closing credits of the show.

Storylines
The event featured wrestlers from pre-existing scripted feuds and storylines. Wrestlers portrayed villains, heroes, or less distinguishable characters in the scripted events that built tension and culminated in a wrestling match or series of matches.

The Heavenly Bodies (Tom Prichard and Stan Lane) replaced the Wrecking Crew due to an agreement by WCW Executive Vice President Bill Watts and Smoky Mountain Wrestling commissioner Bob Armstrong on an earlier episode of Main Event. The Heavenly Bodies' SMW Tag Team Championship was not on the line, making it a non-title match. Watts quit before the event so there was no mention of him and the only mention of his successor was in the closing credits. Chris Benoit and 2 Cold Scorpio fought to draws in January 1993.

Event

Maxx Payne was disqualified in his match against Dustin Rhodes after he pulled the referee into Rhodes to attempt to break an abdominal stretch and throwing Rhodes over the top rope. Payne replaced the injured Ron Simmons.

After Barry Windham's victory over The Great Muta, Ric Flair attempted to place the NWA World Heavyweight Championship belt around Windham's waist, but Windham refused to let him.

Results

References

External links 
 

SuperBrawl 3
1993 in North Carolina
1993 World Championship Wrestling pay-per-view events
Events in North Carolina
Professional wrestling in North Carolina